Guelma ( Qālima; ;) is the capital of Guelma Province and Guelma District, located in north-eastern Algeria, about 65 kilometers from the Mediterranean coast. Its location corresponds to that of ancient Calama.

History

Antiquity

Though Guelma was settled from early prehistory, it was first established as a town under the Phoenicians, who called it Malaca, probably a Phoenician word meaning "salt" (sharing a common etymology with Málaga in Spain). Later, the Romans settled the area and renamed it Calama, part of the Roman province of Numidia. Calama prospered during the rise of Christianity; Saint Possidius was bishop of Guelma during the 5th century. Later, the Vandal invasion devastated the area until the coming of the Byzantines, who settled the area and built city walls to protect it from further invasions. It was located in the Byzantine Exarchate of Africa. However, after the successful Islamic conquest of Algeria, the area was abandoned as a formal settlement, even later, during Ottoman rule.

French rule

Guelma was re-established as a formal settlement during the French invasion of Algeria, after seven centuries of abandonment. The annexation of the area began with the advancing of the French Army going to Constantine  from Annaba (the occupation of Constantine would make north-eastern Algeria officially a part of France) who discovered (and temporarily occupied) the ruins of Calama from 10–15 November 1836 under the command of general Bertrand Clausel.

Guelma was established as a city in 1836.  Its communal constitution dates from 17 June 1854. A modern city quickly developed around the Roman ruins, first inside the restored Byzantine city walls, later also outside the walls, which continued to function during these times, and near the railroad which crossed the city from the west to the east. The Roman theater of Guelma was restored in 1905 under the rule of mayor M. Joly. The city had a high percentage of European settlers during these times, supported by the French colonial policy.
Its civilians suffered greatly during the Sétif massacre of 8 May 1945. Guelma's oldest still-operating religious building (1837) is the El-Atik Mosque, or "The Great Mosque Of Guelma". Guelma has also had a synagogue, which served the local Jews as well as a church on the place de Saint Augustin for the European settlers.

Post-independence

After the Independence of Algeria, both the European settlers and the indigenous Jews left, and the synagogue and the church were converted into mosques. The population of Guelma grew at a rapid pace.

Geography

Guelma is situated at the heart of a major agricultural region, 290 m above sea level and surrounded by mountains (Maouna, Dbegh, Houara). The region is very fertile because of the Seybouse River and a large dam that provides a vast irrigation scheme. It occupies a strategic geographic position as a crossroads in north-eastern Algeria, linking the coast of Wilaya of Annaba, El Taref and Skikda to inland areas such as Wilaya of Constantine, Oum El Bouagui and Souk-Ahras.

Climate
Guelma has a hot-summer Mediterranean climate (Köppen climate classification Csa). In winter there is more rainfall than in summer. About  of precipitation falls annually.

Industry
The city's industries include the manufacture of cycles and mopeds, sugar refinement, ceramics, canning, and semolina milling. Guelma is also known for some traditional industries such as knitting and pottery.

Tourism

Nearby tourist attractions include hot springs, Hammam Debagh (20 minutes away from Guelma), and Hammam Ouled Ali, which contains two resorts and provides services for tourists.
Local hotels include: Hotel Mermoura, Hotel Tarik, Hotel Chelala (Hammam Debagh), Hotel la Couronne, the tourist complex of El Baraka (includes hotel A/B), and the tourist complex of Bouchahernie.

Sports
The city has various sports facilities: the Olympic Stadium, Municipal Stadium, an Olympic swimming pool and a multi-sports hall. Football is the most popular sport in the city, as in all the cities of the country.
Guelma has several football clubs:
 Espérance Sportive de Guelma known as ES Guelma (founded in 1939)
 The Olympic Football Guelma (founded in 1947)
 L'Ettardji Sarri Madinet Guelma (founded on 8 September 1977)

Media
There are no local TV channels or newspapers in Guelma, however, Radio Algérie operates a radio channel in Guelma.

Notable people
 Chafaa Abdelmajid, author, playwright and teacher; one of the leaders of Algeria
 Slimane Benaissa, playwright, dramatist
 Kateb Yacine (Kateb's is his family name, Yacine his first name) is an Algerian writer; born in Constantine August 2, 1929, died October 28 in Grenoble 1989
 Houari Boumediene, President of Algeria from 1965 to 1978; helped the country to stand up after the liberation war against the French
 Abdallah Baali, Algerian diplomat
 Taieb Boulahrouf, FLN militant ; pre-independence FLN and Algeria successively ambassador to Rome, Lima, Bucharest, Buenos Aires, La Paz and Lisbon after independence
 Saddek Boussena, former energy minister, former president of OPEC
 Bettina Heinen-Ayech (1937-2020), painter.
 El-Eulmi, 1st General Secretary of the Presidency during Bouteflika's first term as President of Algeria
 Henri Médus (1904–1985), French operatic bass

References

External links

  Official website of the tourism office of Guelma Province

Cities in Algeria
Guelma District
Communes of Guelma Province
Phoenician colonies in Algeria
Province seats of Algeria
Guelma Province